George Sidney Roberts Kitson Clark (14 June 1900 – 8 December 1975) was an English historian, specialising in the nineteenth century.

Historian
George Kitson Clark was educated at Shrewsbury School and Trinity College, Cambridge. He lived the life of a bachelor don as Fellow of Trinity from 1922 to 1975. He was Reader in Constitutional History from 1954 to 1967.

He is known as a revisionist historian of the Repeal of the Corn Laws. G. D. H. Cole identified a "Kitson Clark" school of historians revising the assessment of the Anti-Corn Law League and the Chartists. He delivered the Ford Lectures in 1959–60, speaking on "The Making of Victorian England".

Jack Plumb, who disliked Kitson Clark, describes him as a reformer of the History Tripos and obstacle to Lewis Namier, with various swipes.

Family
He was the son of the engineer Edwin Kitson Clark and brother of Mary Kitson Clark. His paternal grandfather was E. C. Clark, Regius Professor of Civil Law at the University of Cambridge.

Works
Guide for Research Students Working on Historical Subjects (1958)
Making of Victorian England (1962)
Peel and the Conservative Party (1964)
An Expanding Society: Britain 1830-1900 (1967)
The Critical Historian (1967)
Churchmen and the Condition of England 1832–1885 (1973)
Portrait of an Age (1977) editor

References
Robert Robson (editor) (1967), Ideas and Institutions of Victorian Britain: Essays in honour of George Kitson Clark

Notes

1900 births
1975 deaths
Alumni of Trinity College, Cambridge
Fellows of Trinity College, Cambridge
20th-century English historians